Paolo Manara (1544–1611) was a Roman Catholic prelate who served as Bishop of Acerno (1604–1611).

Biography
Paolo Manara was ordained a priest in the Order of Preachers. On 20 October 1604, he was appointed during the papacy of Pope Clement VIII as Bishop of Acerno. On 14 November 1604, he was consecrated bishop by Girolamo Bernerio, Cardinal-Bishop of Albano, with Agostino Quinzio, Bishop of Korčula, and Lazaro Pellizzari, Bishop of Nusco, serving as co-consecrators. He served as Bishop of Acerno until his death in 1611.

References

External links and additional sources
 (for Chronology of Bishops) 
 (for Chronology of Bishops) 

17th-century Italian Roman Catholic bishops
Bishops appointed by Pope Clement VIII
1544 births
1611 deaths